Season four of Big Brother Germany (Official title: Big Brother: the Battle) lasted from 31 March 2003 to 7 July 2003 and was shown on RTL 2.

Season summary
After a disappointing third season and a two-year absence, Big Brother returned in 2003 with lower expectations and Aleks Bechtel now as the only main host. Copying the "Battle"-format from the Netherlands, the season lasted for 98 Days, making it the shortest season on BB Germany. Eight housemates entered the house on Day 1 with 11 more contestants joining them throughout the season after these intruders lived together on a secret place called "the exile" on Majorca. There were two areas, one "poor" and one "rich" area. When one team won a match, they moved to the rich area and the other had to go to the poor area. The season was won by Jan Geilhufe. The title song of the season was performed by  Olli P., who would eventually become the host in the next season, called Alles ändert sich (Everything changes).

The fact that a certain number of housemates lived together isolated before entering the real show proved to create some tension and relationships between the housemates. Sava Radovic for example was never too shy to flirt with the female contestants starting an on-and-off relationship with both Carla and Larissa in the Exile which became obvious when both entered the house together. After both of the girls got voted off very early blonde Hella made her entry into the main house to become Savas new object of desire and "serious" girlfriend on the show. Thanks to a reported bitchy behaviour in the exile, Lucie Daskiewitsch was the most hated housemate even before making her entrance into the house only to prove that she was not all that bad.

Just like in former years, the winner Jan Geilhufe came from the former GDR and got along with everyone in the house. One could say he would fly under the radar but since similar types of housemates have won before, he was tipped to win from the very first day. He won a prize of 90,000 Euros.

Due to the excitement of return and divide of the household the season proved to be a surprise rating hit and resulted in the decision to progress the twists that were introduced in this season which were eventually seen in the next year.

Housemates

Nominations table

 Housemates on the Red team
 Housemates on the Blue team

Notes

: This week, there were no nominations and all Housemates automatically faced the public vote to evict.
: Due to the departure of both Michel and Marc, Week 1's eviction was cancelled.
: This week, Housemates were only allowed to nominate a member of their own team for eviction. The Housemate with the most nominations from each team would face the public vote.
: Because Clemens and Sava tied with two nominations each, the Red Team was forced to break the tie.
: Because Holger and Lucie tied with two nominations each, the Blue Team was forced to break the tie.
: Because Hella and Nadine tied with two nominations each, the Red Team was forced to break the tie.
: Because Kai and Nadja tied with two nominations each, the Blue Team was forced to break the tie.
: This week, the public were voting for a winner, rather than to evict.

See also
Main Article about the show

External links
Housemate pictures, Nominations and Evictions
All profiles if the housemates season 4 (German)

2003 German television seasons
04